Henry Booth (1788–1869) was a British corn merchant and engineer.

Henry Booth may also refer to:

Henry Booth, 1st Earl of Warrington (1652–1694), MP for Cheshire
Henry Booth (MP for Derbyshire) (died 1446)
Henry Booth (cricketer) (1815–1883), English cricketer

See also
Sir Henry Gore-Booth, 5th Baronet (1843–1900), Arctic explorer, adventurer and landowner
Harry Booth (disambiguation)
Booth (surname)